Halimah Nakaayi (born 16 October 1994) is a Ugandan middle-distance runner who specialises in the 800 metres. She is the 2019 World Champion at the event and won the bronze medal at the 2022 World Indoor Championships. Nakaayi is the current Ugandan record holder for the 800 m both outdoors and indoors, and also for the 1000 metres.

She competed in the 800 m at both the 2016 Rio and 2020 Tokyo Olympics, reaching the semi-finals each time.

Career

2011–2017
At 16, Halimah Nakaayi won the 400 metres at the 2011 Commonwealth Youth Games held in Douglas, Isle of Man.

In 2012, she ran the second 10 km leg of a marathon relay at a festival celebrating 50 years of Ugandan independence. After advancing from fifth to second, she spent four hours in a coma.

Nakaayi was the flag bearer for Uganda in the closing ceremony of the 2016 Rio Olympics.

The following year, she came second in her specialist 800 metres distance at the Islamic Solidarity Games in a time of 2:01.60. At the 2017 World Championships, Nakaayi was eliminated from the event in the semifinals, clocking 2:01.74.

2018–2021: World 800 m champion
In 2018, she placed fourth in the 800 m at the African Championships with a time of 1:58.90. She lost to, 1–3, Caster Semenya, Francine Niyonsaba, and Habitam Alemu by only 0.04 seconds.

In August 2019, Nakaayi won the bronze medal in the event at the African Games behind Hirut Meshesha and Rababe Arafi.

The following month, she became the world 800 m champion in Doha, Qatar, improving her own Ugandan record to 1m 58.04s. She held off Raevyn Rogers, who made a late surge to claim silver in 1:58.18, while Ajeé Wilson finished third in 1:58.84. Nakaayi was joined in the final by compatriot Winnie Nanyondo in fourth.

After suffering a knee problem she reached only the semifinals at the postponed 2020 Tokyo Olympics with her time of 2:04.44 (2:00.92 in the heats).

2022–present
Nakaayi competed in four 800m events of the World Indoor Tour and improved her Ugandan indoor record three times. Racing in Karlsruhe, Val-de-Reuil, Liévin, and Toruń, she finished in positions 1–1–2–2 respectively, with bests of 1:58.58 (Liévin, lost by 0.12s to Natoya Goule) and 1:59.55 set in France. She placed second in Toruń in a triple blanket finish with her time of 2:00.19 equalled by Ethiopia's 19-year-old Tigist Girma, and both behind Catriona Bisset who was 0.03 seconds quicker (photo finish). In March, Nakaayi won the bronze medal at the World Indoor Championships held in Belgrade in a time of 2:00.66, behind Wilson (1:59.09) and Ethiopia's Freweyni Hailu (2:00.54), who overtook Nakaayi just before the finish line.  She won comfortably, however, with both Goule (4th) and Bisset (5th).

At the World Championships in Eugene, Oregon in July, she didn't make it to the final after finishing eighth in her semifinal in a time of 2:01.05. The next month, Nakaayi placed eighth in her specialist event at the Birmingham Commonwealth Games.

International competitions

1Disqualified in the final

Personal bests
 400 metres – 53.02 (Kampala 2017)
 800 metres – 1:58.03 (Monaco 2021) 
 800 metres indoor – 1:58.58 (Liévin 2022) 
 1000 metres – 2:32.12 (Monaco 2020)

References

External links

1994 births
Living people
Ugandan female middle-distance runners
Olympic athletes of Uganda
Athletes (track and field) at the 2014 Commonwealth Games
Athletes (track and field) at the 2018 Commonwealth Games
Commonwealth Games competitors for Uganda
Athletes (track and field) at the 2016 Summer Olympics
People from Mukono District
Athletes (track and field) at the 2019 African Games
African Games bronze medalists for Uganda
African Games medalists in athletics (track and field)
World Athletics Championships athletes for Uganda
World Athletics Championships winners
Competitors at the 2015 Summer Universiade
Athletes (track and field) at the 2020 Summer Olympics
World Athletics Indoor Championships medalists
20th-century Ugandan women
21st-century Ugandan women